Fisheye is Callalily's second album released on March 7, 2008, by Sony Music. It contains singles "Susundan", "Ako'y Babalik" and "Hintay".

Through this second album, it showed that the band has truly matured with their music, illustrating a louder and more powerful "emotional" display of Callalily's sound, musicianship and showmanship.

Track listing

 Good Morning – 0:52
 Ako'y Babalik – 4:48
 Luha – 4:03
 Jewelry Box – 2:26
 Fake Lullabies – 3:37
 Trapped Inside The Moment – 3:48
 Tunay Na Ligaya – 4:46
 Isabel – 5:22
 Inside My Heart – 3:28
 A Starry Night – 4:10
 Shine – 3:26
 Susundan – 3:39
 Dito Ka Lang – 4:15
 Lumbay – 4:00
 Hintay – 5:16
 Song For The Youth – 4:24

References

2008 albums
Callalily albums